A list of films produced in the Soviet Union between 1917 and 1991.

1917-1929
 Soviet films: 1917–1921
 List of Soviet films of 1922
 List of Soviet films of 1923
 List of Soviet films of 1924
 List of Soviet films of 1925
 List of Soviet films of 1926
 List of Soviet films of 1927
 List of Soviet films of 1928
 List of Soviet films of 1929

1930s
 List of Soviet films of 1930
 List of Soviet films of 1931
 List of Soviet films of 1932
 List of Soviet films of 1933
 List of Soviet films of 1934
 List of Soviet films of 1935
 List of Soviet films of 1936
 List of Soviet films of 1937
 List of Soviet films of 1938
 List of Soviet films of 1939

1940s
List of Soviet films of 1940
List of Soviet films of 1941
List of Soviet films of 1942
List of Soviet films of 1943
List of Soviet films of 1944
List of Soviet films of 1945
List of Soviet films of 1946
List of Soviet films of 1947
List of Soviet films of 1948
List of Soviet films of 1949

1950s
List of Soviet films of 1950
List of Soviet films of 1951
List of Soviet films of 1952
List of Soviet films of 1953
List of Soviet films of 1954
List of Soviet films of 1955
List of Soviet films of 1956
List of Soviet films of 1957
List of Soviet films of 1958
List of Soviet films of 1959

1960s
List of Soviet films of 1960
List of Soviet films of 1961
List of Soviet films of 1962
List of Soviet films of 1963
List of Soviet films of 1964
List of Soviet films of 1965
List of Soviet films of 1966
List of Soviet films of 1967
List of Soviet films of 1968
List of Soviet films of 1969

1970s
List of Soviet films of 1970
List of Soviet films of 1971
List of Soviet films of 1972
List of Soviet films of 1973
List of Soviet films of 1974
List of Soviet films of 1975
List of Soviet films of 1976
List of Soviet films of 1977
List of Soviet films of 1978
List of Soviet films of 1979

1980-1991
 Soviet films: 1980–1991

External links
 Soviet movies online at Russian Film Hub
 Soviet film at the Internet Movie Database